Abraham van der Doort (c. 1575/1580? - June 1640) was a Dutch artist.  As Keeper of Charles I's art collections, he was the first Surveyor of the King's Pictures.

Van der Doort's careworn face is familiar from a portrait and engravings held by the National Portrait Gallery in London, but little is known of his early life: indeed, his date of birth is not known with any certainty.  He was probably the son of Peter van Do[o]rt, an engraver of Dutch descent who was working in Hamburg in the early years of the 17th century, a member of a family of Dutch craftsmen that also specialised in the design and manufacture of coins and medals.  Abraham van der Doort probably came to England around 1609, a few years after James I became King of England.  Van der Doort came into the service of Charles' elder brother, Prince Henry.  After Henry's early death in 1612, his collection of paintings, medals, coins and other objets d'art was inherited by Charles, and van der Doort accompanied the collection into Charles' service.  After Charles succeeded his father as king in 1625, van der Doort became Charles' Groom of the Chamber, Surveyor of the King's Pictures; he designed new coins for the Royal Mint.

About 1639, van der Doort compiled a manuscript catalogue of the art collection of the King, described by Ellis Waterhouse as "the fullest catalogues of their day in Europe."  The catalogue survives in a complete manuscript that was preserved by Elias Ashmole and is now held by the Bodleian Library, and in three fair copies of sections, all covered with van der Doort's annotations in a tight crabbed hand.  Under van der Doort's care, and with the guidance of painter-dealers, painter-ambassadors and English painting virtuosi, Charles had assembled what Oliver Millar, in editing a modern edition of catalogue, reckoned was the best single English collection of paintings ever made.  George Vertue's notes on the former Royal Collection were published in 1757, which is the reason that, following its long series of the Vertue notebooks, a collated edition of the four manuscript catalogues was published by the Walpole Society as its Volume 37 (1958–60); it was edited by Millar, who later followed van der Doort as Surveyor of the Queen's Pictures. Millar provides the best biography of van der Doort, and details of the provenance of the pictures, many of which had come from the Gonzaga inheritance in Mantua, with a commentary on their later history and their attributions.

Van der Doort committed suicide in the summer of 1640, distraught that he may have misplaced one of his master's miniatures.  Charles' collection was broken up and sold by auction in 1649, after Charles had been executed.

Van der Doort never lost the Dutch accent that is preserved in his copious annotations to the catalogues in his entirely phonetic spelling.

Notes

Dutch art curators
Artists who committed suicide
16th-century births
1640 deaths
Surveyors of the Queen's Pictures